This is a list of communes in Bến Tre province by district.

Bến Tre

Ba Tri District

Bình Đại District

Châu Thành

Chợ Lách District

Giồng Trôm District

Mỏ Cày Bắc District

Mỏ Cày Nam District

Thạnh Phú District

References 

Ben Tre